Pennbrook Run is a  long second-order tributary to Foster Brook.  This is the only stream of this name in the United States.

Variant names
According to the Geographic Names Information System, it has also been known historically as: 
Foster Brook

Course
Pennbrook Run rises about 0.5 miles southwest of Nichols Run, New York and then flows southwest to meet Foster Brook at Gilmore, Pennsylvania.

Watershed

See also 
 List of rivers of Pennsylvania

References

Rivers of Pennsylvania
Tributaries of the Allegheny River
Rivers of McKean County, Pennsylvania